Michael Koryta  (pronounced ) (born September 20, 1982) is an American author of contemporary crime and supernatural fiction. His novels have appeared on The New York Times Best Seller list, and  have won or been nominated for prizes and awards such as the Los Angeles Times Book Prize, the Edgar Award, the Shamus Award, the Barry Award, the Quill Award, and the International Thriller Writers Awards.

In addition to winning the Los Angeles Times Book Prize, his novel Envy the Night was selected as a Reader's Digest Condensed Book. His work has been translated into more than twenty languages. A former private investigator and newspaper reporter, Koryta graduated from Indiana University with a degree in criminal justice.

In 2008, Koryta was honored with the Outstanding Young Alumni Award by Indiana University.

Career
Michael Koryta began writing at a very early age. As an eight-year-old boy, he wrote to his favorite writers, and by the age of sixteen he had decided he wanted to become a crime novelist. His novel Tonight I Said Goodbye won the St. Martin's Press/Private Eye Writers of America Best First Novel prize.

Many of Koryta's novels have been optioned for potential film or television production. The first to make it to the screen is Taylor Sheridan's adaptation of Those Who Wish Me Dead.

Personal life
He currently lives in St. Petersburg, Florida, and Bloomington, Indiana.Koryta was born and raised in Bloomington, IN. He graduated from Bloomington High School North.

Bibliography

The Lincoln Perry series
Tonight I Said Goodbye (2004)
Sorrow's Anthem (2006)
A Welcome Grave (2007)
The Silent Hour (2009)

The Markus Novak series
Last Words (2015)
Rise the Dark (2016)

Other novels
Envy the Night (2008)
So Cold the River (2010)
The Cypress House (2011)
The Ridge (2011)
The Prophet (2012)
Those Who Wish Me Dead (2014)
How It Happened (2018)
If She Wakes (2019)
The Chill (2020) (writing as Scott Carson)
Never Far Away (2021)
Where They Wait (2021) (writing as Scott Carson)

References

External links
 Fox Acquires Those Who Wish Me Dead Film Rights
 Michael Koryta's Official Web Site
 
 
 

American crime writers
Writers of books about writing fiction
Writers from Bloomington, Indiana
Writers from St. Petersburg, Florida
Indiana University alumni
Living people
21st-century American novelists
1982 births
American male novelists
21st-century American male writers
Novelists from Indiana
Novelists from Florida
Barry Award winners